Petrovichi is a rural locality (a village) in Shumyachsky District of Smolensk Oblast, Russia, located about  southwest of Moscow,  south of St Petersburg,  south of Smolensk, and  east of the border between Belarus and Russia. Its population in 1998 was 215.

The village is the birthplace of Isaac Asimov. Asimov left it at the age of three, with his parents and sister, emigrating to the United States. There is a stone memorial at the site of his birth.

History
The earliest recorded mention of Petrovichi is from 1403. In the Russian Empire, Petrovichi was a shtetl in Klimovichskiy Uyezd (an uyezd with the seat in Klimovichi) of Mogilev Governorate. The governorate, historically Belarusian land, was a part of the Empire's Northwestern Krai. Petrovichi's population was half Jewish, half Belarusian. It had both a church and a synagogue, each one with a school attached to it. According to Asimov's memoirs, the place had never known of pogroms. There were amicable business connections and even friendships between the two communities. Asimov even reports non-Jews paying friendly visits to the local synagogue.

Tsar Nicholas I (who ruled from 1825 to 1855) at one point ordered the expulsion of all Jewish people who resided in Great Russia, or Russia proper, outside of the Pale of Settlement. However, a rich and powerful Russian landlord, who owned much land on both sides of the border, saved the Jewish community of Petrovichi from "ethnic cleansing" by illegally moving the border marker from the west to the east of the shtetl. Thus he saved half of the people from much suffering, as well as saving himself from losing their talents and skills. Petrovichi was an important hub of the wheat trade, and Jewish traders in wheat were respected for their honesty and efficiency. Petrovichi was part of Belarus for several decades.

During the Soviet times, restrictions were no longer imposed on the settlement of Jewish people. The village became a part of the Russian SFSR and briefly belonged to Gomel Governorate before being transferred to Smolensk Oblast. The population dwindled significantly.

In 1921, Asimov and 16 other children in Petrovichi developed double pneumonia. Only Asimov survived.

In July 1941, Petrovichi was occupied by the German armies. 416 Jewish inhabitants who did not flee in time were massacred. It was liberated by the Red Army in September 1943.

References

Notes

Sources

External links
Photo of monument to Asimov at Asimovonline.com
Russian news article (2011) at Google Translate
Russian news article (2015) at Google Translate

Rural localities in Smolensk Oblast
Isaac Asimov
Holocaust locations in Russia
ru:Петровичи (Смоленская область)